Amar Bhoopali (English: The Immortal Song, French: Le Chant Immortel) is a 1951 Indian film, produced and directed by V. Shantaram and written by Vishram Bedekar. It is a true story about a simple cow herder who has an innate gift of poetry, set in the waning days of the Maratha confederacy, c. early 19th century. It is an ode to the saffron flag of Marathas, calling on people to rise again against the foreign enemy. It competed for the Grand Prize of the Festival at the 1952 Cannes Film Festival.

Plot
Honaji Bala, a simple cow herder, becomes a legendary bard who has an innate gift of poetry. The film is set in the last days of the Maratha confederacy of the early 19th Century.

Cast
In credits order translated from Marathi
 Panditrao Nagarkar as Shahir Honaji Bala
 Sandhya as Gunawati
 Lalita Pawar as Vitabai
 Bhalchandra Pendharkar as Bala Karanjikar
 Vishwas as Subedar
 Gulab as Suguna
 Jairampant as Shastribua
 Nimbalkar as Balakaka
 Amina as Jamuna
 Bandopant Sohoni as Ramji Sowcar
 M. George as Elfiston
 Stokes as Robinson
 Chandorkar as Valajimpat
 Kanse as Shiledar
 Shiv Kumar as Natya Porga (Boy Dancer)

Music
The music for the film was composed by Vasant Desai, with lyrics penned by Shahir Honaji Bala. The soundtrack consists of twelve songs, featuring vocals by Panditrao Nagarkar, Lata Mangeshkar and Asha Bhosle. The song "Ghanashyama Sundara" is from this film.

Track listing

Reception

Accolades

In popular culture
The 1980s advertisement for the Marathi newspaper Maharashtra Times used the song "Ghanashyam Sundara Shreedhara" as part of its jingle.

See also
 Bhoopali

References

External links

1951 films
1950s Marathi-language films
1950s historical films
Indian black-and-white films
Indian historical films
Films directed by V. Shantaram
Films set in Maharashtra
Films set in the 1810s